Natividad del Belén Preciado González (born 1 November 1948), known as Nativel Preciado, is a Spanish journalist and writer.

Biography
Nativel Preciado began her professional career at the Arriba (the official newspaper of Francoist Spain) in 1966, then moved to the now-defunct newspaper , where she remained from 1967 to 1971. From 1974 to 1976 she was one of the contributors of Doblón magazine.

Specializing in political news, she was a witness and reporter of the important events that took place during the Transition period for the newspaper ABC and the magazines Interviú and Vindicación Feminista. In 1982 she joined the editorial staff of the newly created Tiempo magazine.

Her activity as an opinion columnist in the written press has been combined with participation in discussions and debates both on radio and television.

Since the late 1960s she has worked in the genre of biography and has written, among others, those of the boxers Muhammad Ali and José Legrá. In 2012 she presented a new book about her contact and experience with new technologies, and more specifically with Twitter. She also reflects on the passage of time. It is titled Si yo tuviera 100.000 seguidores (If I Had 100,000 Followers).

She is part of the writing team for the news magazine Tiempo de Hoy.

Awards
  (1986)
  (1988)
 Finalist for the Premio Planeta de Novela (1999), for her first novel El egoísta
  (2007), for Camino de hierro
 Fernando Lara Novel Award (2014), for Canta sólo para mí

Books
 Biografía completa de Cassius Clay, 1969
 Biografía completa de Legrá, 1969
 Las folclóricas, 1973
 La cara de los Borbones, 1975
 Fuera de campo, 1991. 
 El sentir de las mujeres, 1996
 Amigos íntimos, 1998
 El egoísta, 1999
 Ser feliz, 2000
 Extrañas parejas, 2000
 Bodas de plata, 2003. 
 Camino de hierro, 2006 (previously titled Olvida el Paraíso)
 Llegó el tiempo de las cerezas, 2008
 Nadie pudo con ellos, 2011
 Si yo tuviera 100.000 seguidores, 2012
 Canta solo para mí, 2014

References

External links
 

1948 births
20th-century Spanish novelists
20th-century Spanish women writers
21st-century Spanish novelists
21st-century Spanish women writers
Living people
Spanish biographers
Spanish columnists
Spanish political commentators
Spanish radio personalities
Spanish television journalists
Spanish women journalists
Women biographers
Spanish women columnists
Women radio journalists
Women television journalists
Writers from Madrid